Mediolanum was a fort and small town in the Roman province of Britannia. Today it is known as Whitchurch, located in the English county of Shropshire.

Town
The town was located on a major Roman routeway between Deva Victrix (Chester) and Viroconium Cornoviorum (Wroxeter). The Romans first built a fort which has been tentatively suggested as forming part of the border defences established by Ostorius Scapula around AD 52. By about AD 100, however, the army had probably moved on and the surrounding civilian vicus would have taken over the site. In the mid-2nd century, the area was at least partly covered by timber-framed industrial buildings. The town reached the height of its prosperity by the early 3rd century and there was much rebuilding in stone. This continued for the next hundred years. Masonry houses with associated wooden outhouses were most common during this period. Roman artefacts from the site are on display in the Whitchurch Heritage Centre.

See also
 Other Mediolana of the Roman Empire

References

History of Shropshire
Roman towns and cities in England
Whitchurch, Shropshire